In Zermelo–Fraenkel set theory without the axiom of choice a strong partition cardinal is an uncountable well-ordered cardinal  such that every partition of the set of size  subsets of  into less than  pieces has a  homogeneous set of size .

The existence of strong partition cardinals contradicts the axiom of choice. The Axiom of determinacy implies that ℵ1 is a strong partition cardinal.

References
 
.

Cardinal numbers